LOWB is the solo project of Andy Barlow best known as one-half of chilled downtempo electronic band Lamb which he co-founded with singer Lou Rhodes.

Discography 

Leap and the Net Will Appear is the debut album from LOWB released 3 June 2013 on Distiller Records with the EP Inward Outburst released on 19 May 2013. LOWB recorded a live session/interview on BBC Radio 2's Dermot O'Leary show in May 2013 in May 2013. The album initially had a limited release in 2011 on Barlow's own label Ear Parcel Recordings: the 2013 re-release features additional songs and new artwork.

References

External links 
 Official LOWB website

2013 debut albums